The position of Mayor is a political position elected by the Councillors, along with the Local Governments administrative of Dar es Salaam consisting of not less than 92 wards and is accountable for the Dar es Salaam City Council. 

The current Mayor is Isaya Mwita Charles, who took up office on 16 March 2016. The position was held by the Lord mayor late Didas Masaburi who is no longer on this position for five years that is from 2010 to 2015. Isaya Mwita Charles succeeded him after winning the elections and is now the current Lord mayor. The Lord Mayor of Dar es Salaam is the Lord Mayor, Chairman of City Council of Dar es Salaam, first citizen and civic head of Dar es Salaam. 

The appointment is made by the council every five years depending on calendar schedule given by the Ministry responsible for Local Government , at the same time appointing a Deputy Mayor , the city's other civic head assisting the Lord Mayor.  

The Karimjee compound of Dar es Salaam, is the Lord Mayor's Office during his or her term in office.

List of Mayors
Below is a list of the seventeen mayors who held the terms in office from 1949 to the current mayor elected in 2016.

References

External links
 Dar es Salaam City Council website